Hesar-e Yazdan (also Romanized as Ḩeşār-e Yazdān and Ḩeşār Yazdān) is a village in Roqicheh Rural District, Kadkan District, Torbat-e Heydarieh County, Razavi Khorasan Province, Iran. At the 2006 census, its population was 457, in 121 families.

References 

Populated places in Torbat-e Heydarieh County